Île-Bonaventure-et-du-Rocher-Percé National Park is a provincial park of Quebec.

The park is located at the tip of the Gaspé Peninsula near the village of Percé, Quebec, and was created in 1985 to protect the large migratory bird sanctuary found on Bonaventure Island, as well as nearby Percé Rock just off the mainland. The park's area covers 5.8 km2, of which only a small portion is located on the mainland.

Boat and island tours are offered from May to October.  The island features five hiking trails.  Park wardens and naturalists also offer guided bird, fossil and geology walks and tours.

The park's main interpretation centre is located on the mainland in Percé, in a restored building known as Le Chafaud. The exhibits focus on the park's bird colonies, marine life, ecosystem, geology and history. There are about 250,000 birds in the park.

References
This article was initially translated from the French Wikipedia.

External links

Parc national de l'île-Bonaventure-et-du-Rocher-Percé - official site in English
Parc national de l'île-Bonaventure-et-du-Rocher-Percé - Tourism Gaspésie information
Additional tour information

National parks of Quebec
Protected areas of Gaspésie–Îles-de-la-Madeleine
Museums in Gaspésie–Îles-de-la-Madeleine
Natural history museums in Canada
Tourist attractions in Gaspésie–Îles-de-la-Madeleine